Ftan is a former municipality in the district of Inn in the Swiss canton of Graubünden.  On 1 January 2015 the former municipalities of Ardez, Guarda, Tarasp, Ftan and Sent merged into the municipality of Scuol.

History
Ftan is first mentioned in 1150 as Vetane.

Geography

Of this area, 40.6% is used for agricultural purposes, while 15.4% is forested. Of the rest of the land, 1.2% is settled (buildings or roads) and the remainder (42.8%) is non-productive (rivers, glaciers or mountains).

The former municipality is located in the Suot Tasna sub-district of the Inn district on a terrace above the left bank of the Inn river.  It consists of the village sections of Ftan Grond and Ftan Pitschen.  Until 1943 Ftan was known as Fetan.

Demographics
Ftan had a population (as of 2014) of 492.  , 11.2% of the population was made up of foreign nationals.  Over the last 10 years the population has grown at a rate of 9.6%.

, the gender distribution of the population was 49.2% male and 50.8% female.  The age distribution, in Ftan is; 57 children or 11.0% of the population are between 0 and 9 years old.  40 teenagers or 7.8% are 10 to 14, and 84 teenagers or 16.3% are 15 to 19.  Of the adult population, 39 people or 7.6% of the population are between 20 and 29 years old.  65 people or 12.6% are 30 to 39, 69 people or 13.4% are 40 to 49, and 53 people or 10.3% are 50 to 59.  The senior population distribution is 43 people or 8.3% of the population are between 60 and 69 years old, 48 people or 9.3% are 70 to 79, there are 15 people or 2.9% who are 80 to 89, and there are 3 people or 0.6% who are 90 to 99.

In the 2007 federal election the most popular party was the SVP which received 43% of the vote.  The next three most popular parties were the SPS (42.1%), the FDP (7.7%) and the CVP (5.1%).

In Ftan about 81.8% of the population (between age 25-64) have completed either non-mandatory upper secondary education or additional higher education (either university or a Fachhochschule).

Ftan has an unemployment rate of 0.81%.  , there were 64 people employed in the primary economic sector and about 24 businesses involved in this sector.  16 people are employed in the secondary sector and there are 6 businesses in this sector.  180 people are employed in the tertiary sector, with 25 businesses in this sector.

The historical population is given in the following table:

Languages
Most of the population speaks Rhaeto-Romance (57.8%), with German being second most common (37.0%) and Italian being third ( 1.2%).

Hochalpines Institut Ftan

In 1793 the Ftan priest Andrea Rosius à Porta, influenced by Ulysses von Salis-Marschlins and Johann Heinrich Pestalozzi, founded an institute for boys and girls which existed until 1869. This was followed in 1916 by the Hochalpines Töchterinstitut, which since the 1970s has also been a regional secondary school with federally recognised maturities and diplomas (since 1993 Hochalpines Institut Ftan).

References

Scuol
Former municipalities of Graubünden
Populated places disestablished in 2015